"Wait and Bleed" is a song by American heavy metal band Slipknot. Released as the band's debut single off their 1999 self-titled debut album. After being remixed to replace the screamed vocals in the verses with more melodic singing, it was released as the lead single from the album in July 1999, and peaked at number 34 on the American Billboard Hot Mainstream Rock Tracks chart in February 2000. It remains one of the band's signature songs.

Meaning and background
Joey Jordison recalled in an interview with Kerrang!: "I wrote the music for 'Wait and Bleed' on my own… I showed it to the guys at rehearsal, and then Corey wrote some lyrics really fast in our practice space… He took us to a new level immediately." "The song's about that switch in your head that can go at any moment," noted Corey Taylor. "You go from being a civilized human being to someone who can commit terrible acts. I've always been fascinated by the fact we represent ourselves as civilized when, at any moment, we can become animals."

Release, awards, reception and use in popular culture
"Wait and Bleed" earned Slipknot a first Grammy nomination in 2001 for Best Metal Performance, though it lost to Deftones' "Elite". The song won the Best Single award at the 2000 Kerrang! Awards. The song enjoyed a degree of commercial success, reaching number 34 on the Hot Mainstream Rock Tracks chart and number 27 in the UK Singles Chart. It was also ranked number 36 on VH1's "40 Greatest Metal Songs" list. In 2020, Kerrang and Louder Sound ranked the song number four and number one, respectively, on their lists of the greatest Slipknot songs. This track, along with "Left Behind", "Pulse of the Maggots", and "Snuff", were released as downloadable songs in the Rock Band series. A remix version of "Wait and Bleed" by Terry Date was featured on the soundtrack for Scream 3.

Music videos
There are two videos for "Wait and Bleed". The first, directed by Thomas Mignone, features a live performance of the song, filmed during the band's appearance at Ozzfest. The second, known as the "Claymation version", depicts all nine members as small, animated, doll-like creatures inside a laboratory inhabited by a man who is attempting to catch them. Eventually, the band cause the man to fall and be stung by dropping a jar of insects. As the band looks over the man, Chris Fehn's doll covers him in fuel and Shawn Crahan's doll sets him alight, killing him.

As of February 2023, the music video for "Wait and Bleed" has over 132 million views on YouTube.

Track listing
All songs credited to Slipknot.
CD single
"Wait and Bleed"  – 2:34
"Spit It Out"  – 2:28
"(sic)"  – 3:28
 Includes "Wait and Bleed" live music video
 "(sic)" (Molt-Injected Mix) is missing on Netherlands release

EU promo single
"Wait & Bleed"  – 2:34
"Spit It Out"  – 2:28
"(sic)"  – 3:28
 "Wait & Bleed" (Radio Mix) does not have the final "and it waits for you!" scream unlike Terry Date mix
 "(sic)" (Spaceship Console Mix) is no different from Molt-Injected mix

US promo CD single
"Wait and Bleed"  – 2:30
"Wait and Bleed"  – 2:27
"Call-Out Hook"  – 0:12

UK promo CD single
"Wait & Bleed"  – 2:30

Personnel

Slipknot 

(#0) Sid Wilson – turntables
(#1) Joey Jordison – drums
(#2) Paul Gray – bass
(#3) Chris Fehn – percussion
(#4) Josh Brainard – guitar
(#5) Craig Jones – samples, media
(#6) Shawn Crahan – percussion
(#7) Mick Thomson – guitar 
(#8) Corey Taylor – vocals

Additional personnel 
Ross Robinson – production, mixing
Chuck Johnson – engineering, mixing, remix on track 2
Rob Agnello – additional engineering
Sean McMahon – mixing on track 2
Terry Date – remix on track 1
Ulrich Wild – remix on track 3
Eddy Schreyer – mastering
Thomas Mignone – direction on track 4

Charts

Certifications

References

1999 debut singles
Slipknot (band) songs
Songs about suicide
Songs written for films
Songs written by Corey Taylor
Songs written by Jim Root
Songs written by Paul Gray (American musician)
Songs written by Joey Jordison
Roadrunner Records singles
2000 singles